Melvin Bonner (born February 18, 1970) is a former American football wide receiver. He played for the Denver Broncos in 1993.

References

1970 births
Living people
American football wide receivers
Baylor Bears football players
Denver Broncos players